Khan Pur Dhani is a census town in North East district in the Indian territory of Delhi.

References

Cities and towns in North East Delhi district